Fateh is a 1991 Hindi action drama film directed by Talat Jani, starring Sanjay Dutt, Suresh Oberoi, Paresh Rawal and Sonam as leads. Film was average earner at the box office.

Plot
Anand is a major in the military. Ranvir, Karan and Salim are his best commandos. During a military operation against Samrat (Arms Dealer and Drug Mafia), Anand loses his leg and is forced to retire. He returns to his home-town and opens a garage. One day Samrat and his gang members kill disabled Anand.
Karan, Rajvir and Salim decide to take revenge. They start making inquiries and find out that Samrat is responsible for Anand's death. The trio decide to destroy Samrat's empire and kill him.

Cast
 Sanjay Dutt as Karan
 Sonam as Sahira
 Shabana Azmi as Shabana
 Satyajeet as Ranvir
 Mohsin Khan as Salim
 Suresh Oberoi as Major Anand
 Paresh Rawal as Samrat
 Ekta Sohini as Maria
 Shafi Inamdar as Inspector Doshi
 Dinesh Anand as Bablia
 Arun Bakshi as Tau
 Bob Christo as Arms Dealer
 Avtar Gill as DIG Gill
 Manik Irani as Goon
 Satyendra Kapoor as Maria's dad
 Javed Khan as Albert Pinto
 Guddi Maruti as Guddi
 Gavin Packard as Henchman

Music
"Ho Makhna O Chakhna" - Shabbir Kumar, Sukhwinder Singh, Nilesh Kumar 
"Jaam Hai Shaam Hai" - Kavita Krishnamurthy, Anu Malik
"Koi Laila Humein Bhi Zara Dekhein" - Amit Kumar, Suresh Wadkar, Mohammed Aziz
"Tera Mera Mere Tera Bandhan Hai" - Kavita Krishnamurthy, Sukhwinder Singh, Nilesh Kumar, Vinay Mandke, Jayashree Shivram
"Tere Siwa Mere Siwa" - Sapna Mukherjee
"Tum Jo Bane Humdard Hamare" - Anuradha Paudwal, Mohammad Aziz

References

External links
 

Films scored by Anu Malik
1991 films
1990s Hindi-language films
Indian action drama films
Films directed by Talat Jani